Jungle World (previously Jungle Kingdom) is an animal theme park and zoological garden located in Ayub National Park, Rawalpindi District, Pakistan.

The Jungle World Theme Park consists of two interconnected facilities - a family amusement park and a zoo.

Family amusement park 
The Family Amusement Park provides an environment for fun family activities, including an 18-hole Mini Golf Course and thrilling rides like Time Shift Machine, Simba Tower, Giant Wheel, Dodgem Cars, Tea Cups, Hully Gully, Miami Ride, Paddle Boats and MonoTrain etc. In addition, “Mystery House” takes you through a mysterious and frightful exploration 10 mins walk / trip. In addition to this, children can enjoy riding on miniature horses apart from having photography with tamed Macaws and colorful Parrots. Other facilities include:

 Mini golf course
 Indoor snooker
 Bull ride
 Gift shop
 Haunted house
 Paddle boats
 Remote-controlled cars
 Dodging cars
 Inflatable bouncers
 Jungle gym
 Video game arcade
 Running water pool

Zoo 
The Jungle World has the biggest Zoo in the twin cities of Rawalpindi-Islamabad where wildlife species are kept in large and open air enclosures close to nature.  Some of the prominent animals are White Tiger, Bengal Tigers, African Lions, Bears, Puma, Monkeys, Baboons, Vervet, Zebras and variety of Deers.  In addition, a variety of birds have been brought from all over the world like Pheasants, Peacocks, Parrots, Ostriches, Emus, Black Swans, Pelicans, Ducks etc. adds beauty to zoo and interest of the visitors.

Wildlife species are displayed in open air enclosures. Each enclosure is landscaped individually to simulate the natural habitat of the species kept there. Peafowls roam freely in the main park area. Other birds include common pheasant, rose-ringed parakeet, ostrich, black swan, mute swan, silver pheasant, vulturine guineafowls, dalmatian pelican and many other types of water birds. Some mammals are Bengal tiger, lion, nilgai, hog deer, black buck, urial, Asiatic black bear, leopard, plains zebra, red kangaroo, llama, red deer and several species of monkeys.

Jungle World is also the primary setting for the critically acclaimed music video for "The Great Unraveling" by internationally renowned rapper and music producer Adil Omar who chose the location based on childhood memories.

Facilities
Guest rooms
Red Onion restaurant
Topi Rakh auditorium

See also
Ayub National Park
 List of parks and gardens in Pakistan

References

External links
Official website

Zoos in Pakistan
Parks in Pakistan
Tourist attractions in Rawalpindi
Amusement parks in Pakistan